There have been five baronetcies created for persons with the surname Kennedy, one in the Baronetage of Ireland, three in the Baronetage of Nova Scotia and one in the Baronetage of the United Kingdom. One creation is extant as of 2010.

The Kennedy Baronetcy of Newtownmountkennedy was created in the Baronetage of Ireland on 25 January 1666 for Robert Kennedy, member of the Irish House of Commons for Kildare Borough. The second baronet was a distinguished High Court judge. On the death of the fourth Baronet in 1710 the next heir was under attainder and the baronetcy was consequently forfeited.

The Kennedy Baronetcy, of Girvan in the County of Ayr, was created in the Baronetage of Nova Scotia on 4 August 1673 for John Kennedy. The title became extinct on the death of the second Baronet in 1740.

The Kennedy Baronetcy, of Culzean in the County of Ayr, was created in the Baronetage of Nova Scotia on 8 December 1682 for Archibald Kennedy. He was the great-grandson of Sir Thomas Kennedy, Master of Cassilis, younger son of Gilbert Kennedy, 3rd Earl of Cassilis. The fourth Baronet succeeded to the earldom of Cassilis in 1759. The baronetcy remained a subsidiary title of the earldom until the baronetcy became extinct in 1792. See Marquess of Ailsa for more information. Susanna, Countess of Eglinton, daughter of the first Baronet, was a celebrated beauty and literary patron.

The Kennedy Baronetcy, of Clowburn in the County of Lanark, was created in the Baronetage of Nova Scotia on 8 June 1698 for Andrew Kennedy. The title became either extinct or dormant on the death of the second Baronet in 1729.

The Kennedy Baronetcy, of Johnstown Kennedy in the County of Dublin, was created in the Baronetage of the United Kingdom on 18 July 1836 for John Kennedy.  Francis William Kennedy (1862–1939), son of Robert Kennedy, fifth son of the first Baronet, was an Admiral in the Royal Navy. The family seat is Johnstown Kennedy, Rathcoole, County Dublin. As 31 December 2013, the present Baronet has not successfully proven his succession to the baronetcy and is not therefore on the Official Roll of the Baronetage. However, the case is under review by the Registrar of the Baronetage.

Kennedy baronets, of Newtownmountkennedy (1665)
Sir Robert Kennedy, 1st Baronet (died 1668)
Sir Richard Kennedy, 2nd Baronet (died 1685)
Sir Robert Kennedy, 3rd Baronet (–1688)
Sir Richard Kennedy, 4th Baronet (c. 1686–1710)

Kennedy baronets, of Girvan (1673)
Sir John Kennedy, 1st Baronet (died c. 1700)
Sir Gilbert Kennedy, 2nd Baronet (died 1740)

Kennedy baronets, of Culzean (1682)
Sir Archibald Kennedy, 1st Baronet (died 1710)
Sir John Kennedy, 2nd Baronet (died 1742)
Sir John Kennedy, 3rd Baronet (died 1744)
Sir Thomas Kennedy, 4th Baronet, later became the 9th Earl of Cassilis (died 1775)
see Marquess of Ailsa for further history of the baronetcy.

Kennedy baronets, of Clowburn (1698)
Sir Andrew Kennedy, 1st Baronet (died 1717)
Sir John Vere Kennedy, 2nd Baronet (died 1729)

Kennedy baronets, of Johnstown Kennedy (1836)

Sir John Kennedy, 1st Baronet (1785–1848)
Sir Charles Edward Bayly Kennedy, 2nd Baronet (1820–1880)
Sir John Charles Kennedy, 3rd Baronet (1856–1923)
Sir John Ralph Bayly Kennedy, 4th Baronet (1896–1968)
Sir James Edward Kennedy, 5th Baronet (1898–1974)
Sir Derrick Edward de Vere Kennedy, 6th Baronet (1904–1976)
Sir (George) Ronald Derrick Kennedy, 7th Baronet (1927–1988)
Michael Edward Kennedy, 8th Baronet (1956–2012)
George Matthew Rae Kennedy, 9th Baronet (born 1993)

Notes

References
 Kidd, Charles, Williamson, David (editors). Debrett's Peerage and Baronetage (1990 edition). New York: St Martin's Press, 1990, 
 

Kennedy
Extinct baronetcies in the Baronetage of Nova Scotia
Forfeited baronetcies in the Baronetage of Ireland
1666 establishments in Ireland